Katie McKy is an American educator and writer of mainstream material, children's literature, fishing articles for sporting magazines, and professional academic material in the field of education.

McKy was born on August 28, 1956 and received a master's degree in education from Harvard University. McKy worked for over 20 years as a teacher to disadvantaged, learning disabled, and emotionally disturbed students.

McKy's works include Tough Kids/Tough Classrooms, It All Began With a Bean , and Freudian Feral, Gray's Sporting Journal, May/June 2002.

References

External links
 Official website

 Maine Women Magazine
 5ive for Women
 Thimble Literary Magazine
 Sweet Tree Review

American children's writers
American educators
1956 births
Living people
Harvard University alumni
21st-century American women writers
American women non-fiction writers
21st-century American non-fiction writers